Joseph Kerr (1804January 22, 1855) was an American farmer, Whig politician, and Wisconsin pioneer.  He represented Columbia County in the  Wisconsin State Assembly during the 1st and 2nd legislatures (1848, 1849).

Background and election to the Assembly 
He was born in Ohio shortly after the state's admission to the Union, and arrived in Columbia County in the fall of 1846.  When Wisconsin achieved statehood, he was elected to the Assembly's Columbia County seat as a Whig, and was re-elected in the fall of 1848 for the following year. When in April 1849 Randolph was organized as a Town, he was the (unsuccessful) Whig candidate for Chairman of the town board.  He was succeeded in the Assembly seat for 1850 by Hugh McFarlane of Portage.

After the Assembly 
In November 1851 he was a founding member, and was elected First Vice-President, of the Columbia County Agricultural Society. He remained active therein, and in November 1853 was elected President of the Society.

He died January 22, 1855, in Randolph. At the time of his death he had been for years Chairman of the Town of Randolph Board of Supervisors, and thrice been elected Chairman of the Columbia County Board; and was a Director of the La Crosse & Milwaukee Railroad Company. He was married, and was or had been a parent.

References

External links
 

|-

1855 deaths
County supervisors in Wisconsin
Members of the Wisconsin State Assembly
People from Randolph, Wisconsin
Place of birth unknown
Wisconsin city council members
Wisconsin Whigs
19th-century American politicians
Year of birth unknown